William J. Quest (July 20, 1926 – February 23, 1991) was a Democratic member of the Pennsylvania House of Representatives. He was first elected on June 5, 1978.

References

Democratic Party members of the Pennsylvania House of Representatives
1926 births
1991 deaths
20th-century American politicians